New Orleans Baptist Theological Seminary (NOBTS) is a Baptist theological institute in New Orleans, Louisiana. It is affiliated with the Southern Baptist Convention. Missions and evangelism are core focuses of the seminary.

NOBTS offers doctoral, master, bachelor, and associate degrees. The seminary has 13 graduate centers in 5 states, 11 undergraduate centers in 5 states, and 13 on-campus research centers. It has over 3,700 students and trains over 6,000 participants through workshops. NOBTS also has over 22,000 living alumni. The main campus is situated on over 70 acres with more than 70 buildings.

History

The Southern Baptist Convention founded the institution as the Baptist Bible Institute during the 1917 convention meeting in New Orleans. New Orleans Baptist Theological Seminary, or NOBTS for short, was the first institution created as a direct act of the Southern Baptist Convention. The institutes's purpose was centered on missionary work, and initially established as gateway to Central America. The Seminary started as the Baptist Bible Institute in the Garden District and later relocated to the current location in the heart of Gentilly.

On May 17, 1946, the SBC revised the institutes' charter to enable it to become a seminary, and the name was changed to New Orleans Baptist Theological Seminary. Missions and evangelism have remained the core focus of the seminary. In the 1950s NOBTS relocated from Washington Avenue in the Garden District to a more spacious campus in the Gentilly neighborhood of New Orleans. The school purchased a  pecan orchard and transformed it into what is now a bustling campus over 100 buildings, including academic buildings, faculty and staff housing, and student housing. The new campus was designed by noted Louisiana architect A. Hays Town.

Hurricane Katrina, 2005
In August 2005, Hurricane Katrina forced the seminary to evacuate its staff and students. Within a few days, temporary offices were established in Decatur, Georgia. The NOBTS board of trustees overwhelmingly voted to keep the seminary in New Orleans and begin the necessary cleanup and repairs.

The Southern Baptist Executive Committee provided 6.2 million dollars from the Southern Baptist Convention's Cooperative Program to the seminary following Hurricane Katrina. The money helped meet the budgetary requirements of the seminary and aided in the restoration effort. Many churches provided support clean-up and construction teams to assist the seminary in recovering.

Following Katrina, the faculty resumed classes at extension centers and online through the Blackboard Learning System. 85% of the students attending NOBTS continued taking classes during the 2005-2006 academic year. In August 2006 classes fully resumed, and much of the repair had been completed on the campus including the restoration of the Providence Guest House and Leavell Chapel.

Since the completion of main campus buildings, much of the repair is now concentrated on restoring faculty housing and construction of additional buildings. Most, if not all, of the student housing has been restored but at limited capacity. Many of the states housing (housing facilities named after the states in the United States) were demolished with no plans at this time to rebuild them. In addition to repairing facilities damaged or destroyed by hurricane Katrina, the seminary has decided to completely rebuild some buildings to facilitate today's demands. One such building which has been completed is the new Operations Department building which is located at the back of the NOBTS campus.

Presidents
NOBTS has had nine presidents since its founding:

Academics
NOBTS currently offers a wide range of degree options for ministerial training. Leavell College houses the seminary's undergraduate degree program, and offers associates and bachelor's degrees in ministry as well as certificate and diploma programs intended to give concentrated training in a specific area (e.g., children's ministry). The graduate programs are quite varied as well. The faculty is divided into five working divisions: biblical studies, theological & historical studies, pastoral ministries, Christian Education ministries, and church music ministries.

The primary degree offered is the Master of Divinity but the seminary also offers the Master of Arts and Master of Theology degrees as an alternative. For music students, the primary degree is the Master of Church Music. Doctoral degrees are divided between research doctoral degree programs and professional doctoral degree programs. Most departments on campus offer a Doctor of Philosophy program. The Division of Church Music offers the Doctor of Musical Arts degree. The Seminary also offers the highly flexible Doctor of Ministry degree as an alternative professional doctorate. Newly instituted is the Doctor of Educational Ministry degree, which focuses on majors within the Division of Christian Education.

Accreditation 
New Orleans Baptist Theological Seminary is accredited by the Commission on Colleges of the Southern Association of Colleges and Schools to award associate, bachelor's, master's, and doctoral degrees. The graduate programs are also accredited by the Association of Theological Schools in the United States and Canada. NOBTS is also an accredited institutional member of the National Association of Schools of Music and has authorization to operate in the State of Florida.

Extension centers and hubs

View on the authority of the Bible
"We believe that the Bible is the Word of God in the highest and fullest sense, and is the unrivalled authority in determining the faith and practice of God’s people; that the sixty-six books of the Bible are divinely and uniquely inspired, and that they have come down to us substantially as they were under inspiration written. These Scriptures reveal all that is necessary for us to know of God’s plan of redemption and human duty. We deny the inspiration of other books, ancient or modern, and exalt the Bible to an unchallenged throne in our confidence. These Scriptures do not require the authorized interpretation of any church, or council, but are divinely intended for personal study and interpretation, under the guidance of the Holy Spirit."

Archaeology

Timnah 
Between 1977 and 1979, George L. Kelm was serving as professor of Biblical Backgrounds and Archaeology at NOBTS when he and Amihai Mazar uncovered biblical Timnah, Tel Batash in the Sorek Valley of Israel.

Gezer 
In 2010 a team from NOBTS launched an effort to clear a Canaanite Water Shaft at Tel Gezer in Israel in cooperation with the Israeli Nature and Parks Authority and the Israeli Antiquities Authority. Gezer was first explored by R.A. Stewart Macalister over a hundred years earlier, but he did not complete a study of the water system because a freak storm refilled the system with debris and Macalister abandoned the effort.

The NOBTS excavation has been chronicled in multiple sources including the Biblical Archaeology Review and the Baptist Press. In 2011 Dennis Cole, Dan Warner and Jim Parker from NOBTS led another team in an attempt to finish the effort. In just two years the teams removed approximately 299 tons of debris from the ancient water system.

Research centers

Other research centers include:

Baptist Center for Theology and Ministry
Caskey Center for Church Excellence
Cecil B. Day Center for Church Planting & The Nehemiah Project
Center for Discipleship & Spiritual Formation
Global Mission Center
H. Milton Haggard Center for New Testament Textual Studies
Institute for Faith & the Public Square
Landrum P. Leavell II Center for Evangelism & Church Health
Moskau Institute of Archaeology/Center for Archaeological Research
Perry R. Sanders Center for Ministry Excellence
Youth Ministry Institute

Student organizations
In addition to the academics provided at NOBTS, the seminary also offers activities for students and their children.

 Dead Preachers Society 
 Fellowship of Black Seminarians 
 International Student Fellowship 
 Thrive
 Together

Notable landmarks

 The front quadrant of campus was designed by notable New Orleans architect, A. Hays Town. This includes the iconic Leavell Chapel.

Notable alumni

William Leon Clark, deputy chief of chaplains of the United States Air Force 1966-1968.
Grady C. Cothen, author, university and seminary president, pastor, state convention executive secretary-director of the Southern Baptist Convention
Raleigh Kirby Godsey, president of Mercer University (1979–2006)
G. Earl Guinn, president Louisiana College from 1951 to 1975 
Richard Land, president of Southern Evangelical Seminary outside Charlotte, North Carolina
Russell D. Moore, president of the Ethics & Religious Liberty Commission of the Southern Baptist Convention
J. Randall O'Brien, president of Carson-Newman College in Jefferson City, Tennessee
Paige Patterson, former president of Southwestern Baptist Theological Seminary
David Platt, president of the International Mission Board (2014-); pastor-teacher of McLean Bible Church (2017-); pastor of The Church at Brook Hills (2006-2014); author of Radical
Adrian Rogers, president of the Southern Baptist Convention (1979–1980 and 1986–1988); pastor of Bellevue Baptist Church (1972-2005); founder of Love Worth Finding
Argile Smith, former J. D. Grey professor of preaching at NOBTS
Jerry Vines, president of the Southern Baptist Convention (1989–1990); pastor of First Baptist Church of Jacksonville (1982-2006).

Politics
Doug Collins, member of the United States House of Representatives from Georgia, chaplain in the U.S. Air Force Reserve.
Mike Keown, member of the Georgia House of Representatives
Stacey Pickering, former state auditor of Mississippi
David A. Sampson, former United States deputy secretary of commerce; president and CEO of the Property Casualty Insurers Association of America (PCI).
Laurie Schlegel, member of the Louisiana House of Representatives
Jeremy Lee Yancey, former Mississippi state senator and unsuccessful candidate for state treasurer of Mississippi.

Notable faculty
John T. Christian, a Baptist preacher, author and educator
Benjamin Harlan, internationally-known arranger and composer of choral and keyboard works
George L. Kelm - discovered and excavated ancient Timnah between 1977 and 1979 while at NOBTS
Clark Pinnock, Christian theologian, apologist and author. He was Professor Emeritus of Systematic Theology at McMaster Divinity College.
Frank Stagg, theologian

References

External links
 
 

Universities and colleges in New Orleans
Seminaries and theological colleges in Louisiana
Educational institutions established in 1917
Universities and colleges accredited by the Southern Association of Colleges and Schools
Baptist seminaries and theological colleges affiliated with the Southern Baptist Convention
Baptist organizations established in the 20th century
1917 establishments in Louisiana